The 1988–89 Kentucky Wildcats men's basketball team represented University of Kentucky in the 1988–89 NCAA Division I men's basketball season. The team played its home game in Lexington, Kentucky at Rupp Arena.The team was led by fourth-year head coachEddie Sutton

After the season, Head Coach Eddie Sutton’s tenure at Kentucky ended after a scandal and a losing record tarnished the school's basketball program. Kentucky entered the season lacking significant talents in their lineup. Sophomore standout Eric Manuel was suspected of cheating on his college entrance exam and agreed to sit out until the investigation was finished. Potential star recruit Shawn Kemp transferred out of Kentucky after signing with the school earlier that year. The Wildcats were placed in the hands of inexperienced sophomore LeRon Ellis and freshman Chris Mills. The two underclassmen struggled to fill in the talent on the court, resulting in the Wildcats’ first full season losing record since 1927.

Another scandal broke when it was alleged that some employees from Emery Worldwide discovered $1,000 cash in an envelope sent by Kentucky Assistant head coach Dwane Casey to Chris Mills father. It was later shown 
that Casey was uninvolved in the incident.

 and the team finished the season with an overall record of 13–19, Kentucky's first losing season since 1927.

References 

Kentucky Wildcats men's basketball seasons
Kentucky
Kentucky Wildcats
Kentucky Wildcats